Wesseltoft is a surname. Notable people with the surname include:

Bugge Wesseltoft (born 1964), Norwegian jazz musician, pianist, composer, and producer
Erik Wesseltoft (born 1944), Norwegian jazz guitarist and composer, father of Bugge